Johannes Caspers (June 8, 1910 – September 20, 1986) was a German politician of the Christian Democratic Union (CDU) and former member of the German Bundestag.

Life 
In 1946 he joined the CDU and became a member of the Düsseldorf district executive committee in 1947. He was a member of the German Bundestag from 1953 to 1961. He represented the constituency of Düsseldorf II in parliament.

Literature

References

1910 births
1986 deaths
Members of the Bundestag for North Rhine-Westphalia
Members of the Bundestag 1957–1961
Members of the Bundestag 1953–1957
Members of the Bundestag for the Christian Democratic Union of Germany